The 2007 European Junior Baseball Championship was an international baseball competition held at Sportpark De Groote Wielen in Rosmalen, The Netherlands from July 30 to August 5, 2007. It featured teams from Belgium, Czech Republic, France, Germany, Italy, Netherlands, Poland, Russia, Slovakia and Spain.

In the end the team from Italy won the tournament.

Group stage

Pool A

Standings

Game results

Pool B

Standings

Game results

Final round

9th place

7th place

5th place

Semi-finals

3rd place

Final

Final standings

External links
Official Website Host
Game Results

References

European Junior Baseball Championship
2007
European Junior Baseball Championship